Spindletop Hall, located at 3414 Iron Works Pike in Lexington, KY, is the former home of Pansy Yount, wife of Miles Franklin Yount of the Yount-Lee Oil Company.  It is currently the home of the University of Kentucky's staff, faculty, and alumni club, which was founded in 1962.

History of Spindletop Hall

On November 14, 1925, Frank Yount struck oil at the Spindletop field in Beaumont, Texas. Now financially secure, Miles Frank and wife, Pansy, established in Beaumont a stable of American Saddlebred horses, quickly becoming recognized as a leader in the industry.

One day shy of the eighth anniversary of Spindletop's second discovery, Frank Yount died of a heart attack at age 53 on November 13, 1933. Left as the beneficiary of great wealth, Yount's widow, Pansy, mired in controversy in Beaumont, chose Kentucky as the place she would start anew.

At a cost of one million dollars, construction of Spindletop Hall began in 1935 and took two years to complete. Mrs. Yount deemed the house to be a showplace of Kentucky, a modern mansion of classical architecture. At the time of its construction, the circular staircase and the 30X60 foot living room were the largest in Kentucky. On the property were seven miles (11 km) of metal fences, 17 houses for servants and farm hands, and 18 barns. There was a greenhouse, swimming pool, bath house, tennis court, two aviaries, and three kennels. Pansy Yount lived at Spindletop Hall with her adopted daughter, Mildred, and William Capers "Cape" Grant, her third husband and horse trainer. She was considered "new money" by the Kentucky Blue Bloods and was never accepted into their social circle.

During WWII she donated one of her husband Frank's Duesenberg cars to a local scrap drive. 

In early 1959, Spindletop Farm was sold/donated to The University of Kentucky for $850,000. Mrs. Yount died in 1962.  Also in 1962, Spindletop Hall became the residence of the University of Kentucky Faculty, Staff, and Alumni Club. The club's roster has grown from around 500 memberships to nearly 1800 families and individuals.

Inside the mansion

The main floor
Grand Entrance Hall

At the time the house was constructed, the heavy bronze doors which grace the foyer (and a similar pair which open from the library to the porte-cochere) cost $14,000.  The original imported rug was designed to match the elaborately molded plaster ceiling.  The fretwork panels in the stairwells serve as echo chambers for the four keyboard Kimball organ in the music room. Slipcovers, which the owner never removed (this is also true for all draperies in the mansion), hid the Italian velvet draperies.  The massive bronze chandelier, which was designed in Europe, was made in three separate sections.  The wall panels were handpainted in themes representative of mythology.

Music Room

To the right of the Grand Entrance Hall is the Music Room.  The Show Cabinet adjacent to the fireplace wall encased two Stradivarius violins, among other quality musical instruments like a Welte-Kimball automatic organ.

The walls are burled mahogany with ceramic trim.  The mantel is made of imported marble.  An Aubosson carpet (since replaced) complemented the paneled walls.  The crystal chandeliers and wall sconces were made in Czechoslovakia.

Library

Steps lead from the music room to the Library.  There were in excess of 7,000 volumes here prior to Mrs. Yount's donation of the property.  The current collection is courtesy of gifts from the membership of Spindletop.  The center of the room is a fireplace mantel which was removed from Trentham Hall in Staffordshire, England.  The bronze doors lead to the porte-cochere.  An Oriental rug, which cost over $40,000, originally laid over the hardwood floor.

Elizabethan Living Room (Oak Room)

Formal Dining Room

Kitchens

Informal Dining Room

French Powder Room

Upper level

Adam Suite (Manion Suite)

Louis XVI Suite (Yount Suite)

Mr. Grant's Room (Board of Directors Room)

The Colonial Room (Kentucky Room)

Linen closet

Guest Rooms and Baths (Administrative offices)

Spanish Room (Sales and Operations offices)

References

External links
Spindletop Hall, the UK Staff, Faculty, and Alumni Club
Devil's Pocket, Full Discussion of Black Gold to Bluegrass: From the Oil Fields of Texas to Spindletop Farm of Kentucky--how Spindletop Farm came about.

Further reading

 McKinley, Fred B., and Greg Riley. Black Gold to Bluegrass: From the Oil Fields of Texas to Spindletop Farm of Kentucky. Austin: Eakin Press, 2005.

Houses in Lexington, Kentucky
Houses on the National Register of Historic Places in Kentucky
National Register of Historic Places in Lexington, Kentucky
Houses completed in 1937
Buildings at the University of Kentucky
Clubhouses on the National Register of Historic Places in Kentucky
1937 establishments in Kentucky
University and college buildings on the National Register of Historic Places in Kentucky